The Land of Promise is a 1917 American silent comedy drama film produced by Famous Players-Lasky and distributed by Paramount Pictures. It was directed by Joseph Kaufman and starred Billie Burke and Thomas Meighan. The film is based on the 1913 play The Land of Promise by W. Somerset Maugham, in which Burke starred.

The film was remade in 1926 by Paramount as The Canadian with Thomas Meighan reprising his role as Frank Taylor.

Plot
As described in a film magazine, when her employer dies, leaving her penniless, Nora Marsh (Burke) decides to make her home with her brother Edward (Johnston) in Canada. However, she cannot get along with her sister-in-law Gertie (Alden) and she has to find a way out of the house. A hired man, Frank Taylor (Meighan) owns a farm of his own but a storm has destroyed his crops and forced him to work. Shortly after Nora's arrival he leaves for his farm but not before Nora hears him remarking that he intends to get a woman to be his wife and housekeeper, to which Nora decides to take a chance. They get married and he takes her to his house where Nora finally feels she has found a home but before long, Taylor's crops are infested and his entire harvest is destroyed. At the same time, Nora receives some money from England and is thinking of leaving Taylor and moving there but when she learns that he will have to be a hired man again, she decides to stay and give him the money she received so they could save his farm.

Cast
 Billie Burke as Nora Marsh
 Thomas Meighan as Frank Taylor
Helen Tracy as Miss Eunice Wickam
Jack W. Johnston as Edward Marsh (aka J. W. Johnston)
Mary Alden as Gertie Marsh
Margaret Seddon as Miss Pringle
Walter McEwen as James Wickham
Grace Studdiford as Mrs. Wickham (* unclear whether this woman and Grace Van Studdiford are one and the same)
John Raymond as Reginald Hornby

Preservation status
The House That Shadows Built (1931) promotional film by Paramount, contains an unidentified Billie Burke clip almost certainly from The Land of Promise. Other than this brief clip, this is considered a lost film.

References

External links
 

Still with Billie Burke and Thomas Meighan

1917 films
American silent feature films
American films based on plays
Lost American films
Famous Players-Lasky films
Films directed by Joseph Kaufman
1917 comedy-drama films
1910s English-language films
American black-and-white films
1917 lost films
Lost comedy-drama films
1910s American films
Silent American comedy-drama films